DOKA Studios is a Russian video game developer and publisher. It is part of a larger consortium of Zelenograd companies created around scientific and technical creativity. This group was created under direction from the USSR government.

Titles (incomplete) 

 Welltris (1989)
Shortline (1992)
BabyType (1993)
Sadko (1993)
SeaBattle: Admiral Guardian (1994)
 Black Zone (1995)
 Total Control (1995)
Противостояние (1997)

References 

Video game companies of Russia